Kafra (meaning "The village" in Arabic) may refer to:

Palestine
Kafra, Baysan, Palestinian village, depopulated in 1948

Syria
 Kafra, Syria, in Aleppo Governorate
 Kafraa, in Hama Governorate

Lebanon
 Bekaa Kafra, in Bsharri District
 Kafra, Lebanon, in Bint Jbeil District